Andrew Love (November 21, 1941 – April 12, 2012) was a saxophone player based in Memphis, Tennessee, best known for being a member of The Memphis Horns.

Career
Love was born in Memphis, Tennessee, and began his interest in music at the Baptist church where his father was pastor.  His music education continued in high school and at Langston University in Oklahoma.  He returned to Memphis in 1965 and began session work at Stax Records where he teamed up with trumpet player Wayne Jackson.  The two created the signature horn sound at Stax on hit records by Otis Redding, Sam & Dave and others.

After recording numerous tracks at Stax, he and Jackson incorporated themselves into The Memphis Horns and began freelancing.  Love and Jackson recorded at sessions for such artists as Neil Diamond, Elvis Presley and Dusty Springfield.  The duo also toured with The Doobie Brothers, Jimmy Buffett, Robert Cray and numerous other performers.

In 2002, Love was diagnosed with Alzheimer's disease which forced his retirement the following year and his eventual death in 2012 at age 70.

Al Bell, co-owner of Stax records, said "I love saxophone players, and I have many saxophone players I admire and hold in high esteem. But I have never heard a saxophone player who affects and penetrates me like Andrew Love. It was the spirit in him, and you could feel it in the music. He could arouse your deepest emotions, but he would do it gently, softly. It was like he was making love to your soul."

Discography

With Luther Allison
 Live in Chicago (Alligator, 1995 [1999])
With Otis Redding
 Pain in My Heart (Atco Records, 1964)
 The Great Otis Redding Sings Soul Ballads (Atco Records, 1965)
 Otis Blue: Otis Redding Sings Soul (Stax Records, 1965)
 The Soul Album (Stax Records, 1966)
 Complete & Unbelievable: The Otis Redding Dictionary of Soul (Stax Records, 1966)
 King & Queen (Stax Records, 1967)
 The Dock of the Bay (Stax Records, 1968)
With Lulu
 Melody Fair (Atco, 1970)
With Albert King
 Born Under a Bad Sign (Stax Records, 1967)
With David Porter
 Sweat & Love (Enterprise Records, 1974)
With Tony Joe White
 Tony Joe White (Warner Bros. Records, 1971)
With Jimmy Buffett
 Hot Water (MCA Records, 1988)
With Joe Cocker
 Cocker (EMI, 1986)
With Tom Rush
 Ladies Love Outlaws (Columbia Records, 1974)
With Bonnie Raitt
 Longing in Their Hearts (Capitol Records, 1994)
With Keith Richards
 Talk Is Cheap (Virgin Records, 1988)
With Tanya Tucker
 Should I Do It (MCA Records, 1981)
With Carly Simon
 Another Passenger (Elektra Records, 1976)
With José Feliciano
 Memphis Menu (RCA Victor, 1972)
With Billy Joel
 Storm Front (Columbia Records, 1989)
With Nicolette Larson
 Nicolette (Warner Bros. Records, 1978)
With Rufus Thomas
 Do the Funky Chicken (Stax Records, 1970)
With Shirley Brown
 Intimate Storm (Soundtown Records, 1984)
With Stephen Stills
 Stephen Stills 2 (Atlantic Records, 1971)
With Wilson Pickett
 In the Midnight Hour (Atlantic Records, 1965)
 The Exciting Wilson Pickett (Atlantic Records, 1966)
 The Sound of Wilson Pickett (Atlantic Records, 1967)
 Don't Knock My Love (Atlantic Records, 1971)
With Yvonne Elliman
 Rising Sun (RSO Records, 1975)
With Carla Thomas
 Love Means... (Stax Records, 1971)
With Aretha Franklin
 Aretha Now (Atlantic Records, 1968)
 Young, Gifted and Black (Atlantic Records, 1972)
 Hey Now Hey (The Other Side of the Sky) (Atlantic Records, 1973)
 With Everything I Feel in Me (Atlantic Records, 1974)
With William Bell
 The Soul of a Bell (Stax Records, 1967)
With John Prine
 Common Sense (Atlantic Records, 1975)
With James Taylor
 Mud Slide Slim and the Blue Horizon (Warner Bros. Records, 1971)
With Eddie Floyd
 Knock on Wood (Stax Records, 1967)
With B.B. King
 To Know You Is to Love You (ABC Records, 1973)
 Friends (ABC Records, 1974)
With Steve Cropper
 Playin' My Thang (MCA Records, 1981)

References

1941 births
2012 deaths
African-American saxophonists
American male saxophonists
Deaths from Alzheimer's disease
Neurological disease deaths in Tennessee
Langston University alumni
Musicians from Memphis, Tennessee
Rhythm and blues saxophonists
20th-century African-American people
21st-century African-American people
20th-century American saxophonists